Table for 12 is an American reality television series featuring the Hayes family, with two sets of twins and a set of sextuplets, who reside in Morganville, New Jersey. The series debuted on TLC in 2009.

The episodes of Table for 12 look at the Hayes family through events such as preparing to go back to school, birthdays, a road trip and more. The episodes show outings and daily things but with two sets of twins and four year old sextuplets.  All of the children were conceived with the help of follicle stimulation.

Family
Parents

Eric John Hayes - born 
Elizabeth Mary "Betty" Hayes (née Figler) - born 

Oldest Twins
Kevin and Kyle Hayes - born 

Second Set of Twins
Kieran Hayes and Meghan Hayes - born 

The sextuplets oldest to youngest:
Tara Hayes,
Rachel Hayes,
Ryan Hayes,
Connor Hayes,
Rebecca Hayes,
&
EJ Hayes 

- born

Episodes

Season 1 (2009)

Season 2 (2009)

Specials

References

2009 American television series debuts
2000s American reality television series
2009 American television series endings
Television shows set in New Jersey
Marlboro Township, New Jersey
TLC (TV network) original programming
Television series about children
Television series about families